Jonathan Nsenga (born 21 April 1973) is a retired Belgian hurdler.

He was born in Mons and represented the club OCAN. In his early career he won the silver medal at the 1994 Jeux de la Francophonie, the gold medal at the 1995 Universiade, the bronze medal at the 1996 European Indoor Championships and the silver medal at the 1997 Universiade. He participated at the 1992 World Junior Championships, the 1994 European Championships, the 1995 World Indoor Championships, the 1995 World Championships, the 1996 Olympic Games and the 1997 World Championships without reaching the final. In 1997 he received a three-month doping ban for ephedrine use.

After the doping ban he finished fourth at the 1998 European Indoor Championships, eighth at the 1998 European Championships, eighth at the 1999 World Championships and second at the 1999 Universiade and seventh at the 2000 European Indoor Championships. He also competed at the 2000 Olympic Games, the 2001 World Championships, the 2002 European Championships, the 2003 World Indoor Championships, the 2003 World Championships (did not finish), the 2005 World Championships and the 2006 European Championships (did not finish) without reaching the final.

He became Belgian champion in 1994, 1997, 1999, 2001, 2002, 2005 and 2006. His personal best time was 13.25 seconds in the 110 metres hurdles, achieved in the semifinal of the 1998 European Championships in Budapest. This is the Belgian national record as of 2007. In the 60 metres hurdles he had 7.55 seconds, also achieved in 1998. He was given the Golden Spike award in the same year.

He is now a coach. Among his athletes are Adrien Deghelt.

References

1973 births
Living people
Belgian male hurdlers
Athletes (track and field) at the 1996 Summer Olympics
Athletes (track and field) at the 2000 Summer Olympics
Olympic athletes of Belgium
World Athletics Championships athletes for Belgium
Doping cases in athletics
Belgian sportspeople in doping cases
Belgian athletics coaches
Universiade medalists in athletics (track and field)
Universiade gold medalists for Belgium
Medalists at the 1995 Summer Universiade
Medalists at the 1997 Summer Universiade
Medalists at the 1999 Summer Universiade
Sportspeople from Mons
20th-century Belgian people